Joanna Atkins (born January 31, 1989) is an American sprinter and American Record Holder  who specializes in the 400 meter dash. She attended Stephenson High School in Stone Mountain, GA.

College career
Atkins ran track for the Auburn Tigers under coach Henry Rolle where in 2009 she took first place at the NCAA Women's Division I Outdoor Track and Field Championships in the 400 meter dash and was Southeastern Conference champion in the same event.

International career
At the 2013 USA Outdoor Track and Field Championships Atkins finished in 4th place.  This finish assured her a spot as a team member of the 4x400 meter relay at the 2013 World Championships in Athletics.

References

External links

1989 births
Living people
American female sprinters
Auburn Tigers women's track and field athletes
African-American female track and field athletes
World Athletics Championships athletes for the United States
World Athletics Championships medalists
Track and field athletes from Dallas
World Athletics Indoor Championships winners
World Athletics Championships winners
21st-century African-American sportspeople
21st-century African-American women
20th-century African-American people
20th-century African-American women